The 2022–23 Kentucky Wildcats men's basketball team represented the University of Kentucky in the 2022–23 NCAA Division I men's basketball season. The Wildcats, founding members of the Southeastern Conference, played their home games at Rupp Arena and were led by John Calipari in his 14th season as head coach.

Previous season
The Wildcats finished the 2021–22 season 26–8, 14–4 in SEC play to finish a tie for second place. As the No. 3 seed in the SEC tournament, they defeated Vanderbilt in the quarterfinals before losing to Tennessee in the semifinals. They received an at large bid to the NCAA tournament as the No. 2 seed in the East region. The Wildcats  became just the 10th No. 2 seed to lose in the First Round of the NCAA Tournament, losing to No. 15-seeded Saint Peter’s 85–79 in overtime. It also marked the first time Kentucky had suffered a First Round exit under Calipari.

Offseason

Player departures

Class of 2022 signees
The Wildcats signed a two man class of Chris Livingston and Cason Wallace.  Sharpe enrolled in January to join the 2022 team.

Class of 2023 commitments
On November 20, 2021, Reed Sheppard verbally committed to UK over multiple offers, with Louisville and Virginia among the most active in attempting to recruit him. The son of former UK basketball players Jeff Sheppard and the former Stacey Reed, he was the first commitment to the 2023 recruiting class. At the time of his commitment, he was the #3 ranked combo guard in the 2023 class by 247 Sports. On November 14, 2022, D. J. Wagner, ranked as the top point guard in the class by ESPN and Rivals, committed to the University Of Kentucky, deciding over Louisville.

Incoming transfers

Roster

Schedule and results

|-
!colspan=12 style=""| Big Blue Bahamas exhibition trip

|-
!colspan=12 style=""| Exhibition

|-
!colspan=12 style=| Regular season

|-
!colspan=12 style=""| SEC Tournament

|-
!colspan=12 style=| NCAA tournament

Source

References

Kentucky Wildcats men's basketball seasons
Kentucky
Kentucky basketball, men, 2022-23
Kentucky basketball, men, 2022-23
Kentucky